General Belgrano is a central department of Chaco Province in Argentina.

The provincial subdivision has a population of about 10,500 inhabitants in an area of  1,218 km², and its capital city is Corzuela, which is located around 1,250 km from the Capital federal.

The department is named in honour of General Manuel Belgrano (June 3, 1770 – June 20, 1820), an Argentine economist, Lawyer, Politician and military leader.

References

1917 establishments in Argentina
Departments of Chaco Province